WEDC, WCRW and WSBC were radio stations operating on 1240 AM in the Chicago market. They operated as "shared-time stations" for most of their existence. This was not uncommon in the early days of radio, but is very rare in modern times.  They were also foreign language stations, catering to "niche markets". WEDC was first licensed on October 4, 1926. In 1928, the station began sharing the frequency with WCRW and WSBC.

Foreign-language broadcasters were always under government suspicion, especially during years when the US was at war, because of the fear of "un-American", or "coded" information being broadcast. A nationwide council of owners of foreign language stations, including WEDC, was formed during World War II to uphold the good name of foreign-language radio stations and ensure foreign propaganda was banned from being broadcast.

The Broadcasting Yearbook notes that WEDC operated 11 hours daily. The three stations on 1240 were each authorized 8 hours, but according to Ed Jacker, owner of WCRW, "no one listened overnight" so WCRW sold its 3 overnight hours to WEDC.

WEDC's original studios were located on Ogden Avenue at the car dealership known as Emil Denemark Cadillac, the owner of the station. The studio was in the showroom in a glass booth.

In the 1960s, WEDC was purchased by Roman Pucinski for $225,000. Pucinski was a Congressman and later, a Chicago alderman. His mother was a long-time program host and did a daily Polish language program on WGES that included news, interviews, recipes, and commentary of interest to Chicago's Polish community. Pucinski purchased WEDC after WGES dropped all of its foreign language programming to become an all African American-oriented station. The Congressman fought the WGES format change because he wanted to preserve foreign-language radio programming in Chicago. Soon after Pucinski's purchase of the station, WEDC's studios  and transmitter were moved to the Jefferson Park neighborhood on Milwaukee Avenue on Chicago's northwest side.
 In 1966, Pat Sajak, now host of TV's "Wheel of Fortune", was employed to read hourly five-minute newscasts during an all-night Spanish-music radio program.

The format of WEDC had always been mostly foreign language programming, mainly Polish and Spanish. Under the Denemark ownership in the 1950s, an English language program featuring "Love Music" aired from 3:30-5 p.m. weekdays, and its overnight program, "The Midnight Fliers" (from Midnight-6 a.m.) featured big band music. In the 1930s, the station broadcast live music of jazz bands from night club venues in Chicago. There was also African American-oriented programming on WEDC and its sister stations produced by Jack L. Cooper.

In 1995, WCRW was purchased by the owner of WSBC, Daniel Lee, for $500,000. A year later, he also purchased WEDC for $750,000 to make WSBC a 24-hour-a-day radio station; this ended the 60+ years of "shared-time" operation. The next year, Lee sold WSBC to Fred Eychaner's Newsweb; Eychaner was the former owner of WPWR-TV Channel 50 Chicago. WSBC and WEDC used separate transmitter sites, located within a mile of each other on the northwest side of Chicago. Lee was once the owner of WXRT-FM and WSCR in Chicago. Those stations were later sold to Westinghouse Broadcasting, and are now a part of CBS.

At midnight on June 13, 1997, WSBC took over WEDC's hours, putting an end to the last of the original time-sharing arrangements in the United States. The station's former studios are now occupied by WCPT (AM), also owned by Newsweb.

References

EDC
Defunct radio stations in the United States
Radio stations established in 1926
Radio_stations_disestablished_in_1997 
1926_establishments_in_Illinois 
1997 disestablishments in Illinois
EDC